Sir George William Des Vœux  (22 September 1834 – 15 December 1909) was a British colonial administrator who served as governor of Fiji (1880–1885), Newfoundland (1886–1887), and Hong Kong (1887–1891).

Early life
Des Vœux was born as the eighth of nine children of Reverend Henry Des Vœux (1786–1857) and his second wife Fanny Elizabeth Hutton in Baden-Baden, Germany, on 22 September 1834. His grandfather was Irish politician Sir Charles des Voeux, 1st Baronet. His great-grandfather was a Huguenot from Normandy, France, who settled in Ireland in the early 18th century.

Des Vœux attended a public school in London before starting his studies at Charterhouse School (1845–1853) and Balliol College, Oxford (1854–1856), but left without a degree after his father gave him the choice of finishing his degree and become a clergyman or seeking his fortune in the colonies. 
Des Vœux then moved to Canada, where he finished his BA at the University of Toronto and became a barrister in Upper Canada in 1861.

Colonial services

Des Vœux became stipendiary magistrate and superintendent of rivers and creeks in British Guiana from 1863 to 1869, where he championed native causes. First stipendiary magistrate in the East Bank Demerara district, he was later transferred to the Upper Demerara-Berbice region, he argued that this transfer was to limit his influence and power on decisions being made in the main city of the colony Georgetown. He was one of the leading figures (with Joseph Beaumont and James Crosby) against the system of Indian indenture system. Based on his experience in Guiana where he witnessed many instances of cruel and unjust treatment of indentured servants by plantation owners and managers, des Vœux wrote a 10,000-word report in 1869 to Lord Granville, the Secretary of State for the Colonies in which he detailed many abuses. When the contents of the report were published, there was a great outcry and the Commission of Inquiry into the Treatment of Immigrants was conducted. Des Vœux gave testimony before the commission in Georgetown and its report led to many improvements in the workers' treatment. 

He reorganised and codified old French system of law when he was the Administrator and Colonial Secretary of St. Lucia between 1869 and 1880. Afterwards, Des Vœux was appointed Governor of Fiji and High Commissioner for the Western Pacific from 1880 to 1885. He was appointed Governor of Newfoundland from 1886 to 1887.

Governor of Hong Kong

Des Vœux served as the tenth Governor of Hong Kong from 1887 to 1891. This was the last post he held in the Colonial Services. During his tenure the Peak Tram began operation in 1888, providing relatively affordable transportation for people living on The Peak. Des Vœux segregated the Peak together with effectively all the elevated areas of Hong Kong Island from crowded Chinese-style tenements by enacting the European District Reservation Ordinance in November of that year. A year before he left office, the newly established Hong Kong Electric Company began providing electricity to Hong Kong Island.

Post-governorship
After Des Vœux's time as Governor of Hong Kong ended, he entered retirement.  He was created a Knight Grand Cross of the Order of St Michael and St George in 1893.  In 1903, he published his memoirs called My Colonial Service in British Guiana, St. Lucia, Trinidad, Fiji, Australia, Newfoundland, and Hong Kong with Interludes.

Personal life
On 24 July 1875, Des Vœux married Marion Denison Pender (1856–1955), daughter of submarine telegraphy pioneer John Pender. They had two daughters and five sons, three of whom died in infancy. Des Vœux died in Brighton, England, on 15 December 1909. William Des Vœux's son Henry John (1876-1940), married Dorothy Turner-Farley in 1911. Their son, Lt-Colonel Sir Richard, the eighth and last Des Vœux baronet, was killed in action at Arnhem in September 1944.

Honours
 Companion of the Order of St Michael and St George, 1877
 Knight Commander of the Order of St Michael and St George, 1883
 Knight Grand Cross of the Order of St Michael and St George, 1893

Namesakes
Des Voeux Road, Hong Kong
Des Voeux Peak, second highest peak on Taveuni Island, Fiji

References

Sources
Stephanie Williams, Running the Show: The Extraordinary Stories of the Men who Governed the British Empire, Viking 2011, .

External links

Des Voeux, George William (1903). My Colonial Service in British Guiana, St. Lucia, Trinidad, Fiji, Australia, Newfoundland, and Hong Kong with Interludes. Vol. 1 / Vol. 2. London: John Murray.

Chief secretaries (British Empire)
High Commissioners for the Western Pacific
1834 births
1909 deaths
Des Voeux family
Governors of Fiji
Governors of Hong Kong
Governors of Newfoundland Colony
Governors of British Saint Lucia
British Guiana judges
British expatriates in Canada
British expatriates in Guyana
Knights Grand Cross of the Order of St Michael and St George
People educated at Charterhouse School
Alumni of Balliol College, Oxford
University of Toronto alumni
British people of French descent
Irish people of French descent
People from Baden-Baden
19th-century Hong Kong people
19th-century British politicians